Proteoteras naracana is a moth of the family Tortricidae. It is found in North America, where it has been recorded from Alabama, Illinois, Indiana, Kentucky, Maryland, Massachusetts, Ohio, Pennsylvania, Tennessee, West Virginia and Wisconsin.

The wingspan is 15–17 mm. Adults are on wing from April to July.

The larvae feed on Acer species.

References

Moths described in 1907
Eucosmini
Moths of North America